Rafidine Abdullah (born 15 January 1994) is a footballer who plays as a midfielder. He is comfortable at playing either defensively or offensively. Born in France, he represents the Comoros national team internationally.

Club career

Marseille
After training with the senior team during the 2011–12 season under former manager Didier Deschamps, ahead of the ensuing season under new manager Élie Baup, Abdullah was promoted to the senior team permanently and assigned the number 13 shirt. He made his professional debut on 9 August 2012 in the second leg of the team's third qualifying round tie against Turkish club Eskişehirspor.

Cádiz
On 3 August 2016, Abdullah moved abroad for the first time in his career, signing a two-year contract with Spanish Segunda División club Cádiz CF.

Waasland-Beveren
On 17 July 2018, Waasland-Beveren announced, that they had signed Abdullah on a two-year contract. After playing only 644 minutes in ten games, Abdullah and the club decided to terminate the contract by mutual consent on 28 January 2019. Abdullah''s contract expired after Waasland-Beveren declined to renew following the end of the 2021–22 Swiss Challenge League.

International career
Abdullah was born in France to parents of Comorian descent. A French youth international having represented his nation at under-18 level. He switched to the Comoros national team and made his debut for them in a 2–2 friendly tie with Togo.

Career statistics

References

External links 
 
 
 
 
 
 

1994 births
Living people
French sportspeople of Comorian descent
Citizens of Comoros through descent
Comorian footballers
Comoros international footballers
French footballers
Footballers from Marseille
Association football midfielders
France youth international footballers
2021 Africa Cup of Nations players
Ligue 1 players
Championnat National 2 players
Championnat National 3 players
Segunda División players
Belgian Pro League players
Swiss Challenge League players
Olympique de Marseille players
FC Lorient players
Cádiz CF players
S.K. Beveren players
FC Stade Lausanne Ouchy players
French expatriate footballers
French expatriate sportspeople in Spain
French expatriate sportspeople in Belgium
French expatriate sportspeople in Switzerland
Expatriate footballers in Spain
Expatriate footballers in Belgium
Expatriate footballers in Switzerland